Port Vato, locally known as Daakie, is a language of Ambrym Island, Vanuatu.

References

External links
 Daakie DoReCo corpus compiled by Manfred Krifka. Audio recordings of narrative texts with transcriptions time-aligned at the phone level, translations, and - for some texts - time-aligned morphological annotations.

Paama–Ambrym languages
Languages of Vanuatu